The Lyric Theatre is a performing arts theatre located in Swift Current, Saskatchewan, Canada. The building was declared a municipal heritage property in 2007.
The theatre was originally built as a Vaudeville and silent film theatre with 400 seats. It operated as a movie house until 1980, when it was converted into a night club. In 2005, it was purchased by a community group (Southwest Cultural Development Group) and became a performing arts cultural centre.  

A two-story brick construction, the building originally had the theatre on the main floor, apartments on the upper floors (primarily used by employees of the theatre), with the basement housing a pool hall and bowling alley.

References

External links

Buildings and structures in Swift Current
Theatres completed in 1912
Theatres in Saskatchewan
Music venues in Saskatchewan
Cinemas and movie theatres in Saskatchewan
Former cinemas in Canada
1912 establishments in Saskatchewan